The following sortable table comprises the 76 highest ocean islands of greater North America.

This article defines the ocean islands of greater North America to include the coastal islands of North America, the islands of the Caribbean Sea, the Lucayan Archipelago, the islands of Greenland (Kalaallit Nunaat), the islands of Canada, and the islands of Alaska.  The Hawaiian Islands are not included because they are considered part of Oceania.



Highest islands

Greenland and Hispaniola rise above .  Eleven islands rise above , and the following 76 islands rise above .

Gallery

See also

North America
Geography of North America
List of islands of North America

Islands
Mountains
Volcanoes

Notes

References

External links

Natural Resources Canada (NRC)
Canadian Geographical Names @ NRC
United States Geological Survey (USGS)
Geographic Names Information System @ USGS
United States National Geodetic Survey (NGS)
Geodetic Glossary @ NGS
NGVD 29 to NAVD 88 online elevation converter @ NGS
Survey Marks and Datasheets @ NGS
Instituto Nacional de Estadística, Geografía e Informática (INEGI)
Sistemas Nacionales Estadístico y de Información Geográfica (SNEIG)
Bivouac.com
Peakbagger.com
Peaklist.org
Peakware.com
Summitpost.org

Mountains of North America
Geography of North America
North America-related lists
North America, List Of The Highest Islands Of